Modestas Vorobjovas (born 30 December 1995) is a Lithuanian professional footballer who plays as a midfielder for Liga I club Chindia Târgoviște and the Lithuania national team.

International career 
Vorobjovas made his international debut for Lithuania in 2018.

International stats

International goals
Scores and results list Lithuania's goal tally first.

Honours
Šiauliai
Lithuanian Cup runner-up: 2012–13

Trakai
A Lyga runner-up: 2016
Lithuanian Cup runner-up: 2015–16

Žalgiris
A Lyga: 2020
Lithuanian Supercup: 2020

References

External links

1995 births
Living people 
Sportspeople from Šiauliai
Lithuanian footballers
Lithuania international footballers
Association football midfielders
A Lyga players
FC Šiauliai players
FK Riteriai players
FK Žalgiris players
Liga I players
FC UTA Arad players
AFC Chindia Târgoviște players
Lithuanian expatriate footballers
Lithuanian expatriate sportspeople in Romania
Expatriate footballers in Romania
Lithuanian people of Russian descent